Lee Pope is an unincorporated community in Crawford County, in the U.S. state of Georgia.

History
A post office called Lee Pope was established in 1889, and remained in operation until 1951. The community was named after the local Lee and Pope families, early settlers.

References

Unincorporated communities in Crawford County, Georgia